Netrokona-5 is a constituency represented in the Jatiya Sangsad (National Parliament) of Bangladesh from 2008 by Waresat Hussain Belal of the Awami League.

Boundaries 
The constituency encompasses Purbadhala Upazila.

Members of Parliament

References

External links
 

Parliamentary constituencies in Bangladesh